Kurt Weiland is a native of Austria and an executive in the Church of Scientology International. He is director of external affairs for the Church of Scientology's Office of Special Affairs, and Scientology's vice president of communications. He is a member of the organization's board of directors, and handles government, legal and public affairs for Scientology. He has often represented Scientology to the press as a media spokesman. Weiland works out of the Church of Scientology's offices in Los Angeles, California.

Work for Church of Scientology
In 1984 Weiland was a member of the Church of Scientology's Religious Technology Center, and performed work for the organization in Santa Barbara, California. Weiland was executive director of Scientology's Office of Special Affairs in 1994, and was responsible for its international legal affairs and public relations. In December 1994 he prevented Richard Leiby, a reporter for The Washington Post, from attending a luncheon at the National Press Club sponsored by the Church of Scientology International. Weiland did not allow Leiby to enter the First Amendment Lounge, and told him: "You seem to make a living by writing falsehoods." "We know that you used to work in Clearwater, and we know exactly what you wrote," Weiland said to Leiby.

In an interview at the National Press Club in 1994, the St. Petersburg Times asked Weiland and Scientology President Heber Jentzsch about the Church of Scientology's practice of investigating reporters who write about Scientology. "First of all, we don't do that. There's no institutional or organized campaign or effort or action ongoing to go after a reporter," lied Weiland. When asked about a discrepancy after Church of Scientology officials confirmed in 1998 that their attorneys had hired a firm to investigate a reporter for the Boston Herald, Weiland said: "It's not a personal thing. Every time a reporter steps out of his way to create damage to the church ... then, of course, it's gloves off." He said that the Boston Herald reporter's articles were inaccurate, and the Church of Scientology decided to investigate the individual in order to determine what "vested interest" he was working for and what "sinister motive" he had.

Weiland was the Deputy Commanding Officer of the Office of Special Affairs in 1995, and served on the board of directors of the Church of Scientology International. In 1996 he was director of the Office of Special Affairs, and in 1997 Weiland managed external affairs for the Church of Scientology.

On June 13, 2003, Weiland accompanied actor and Scientologist Tom Cruise and director of the Church of Scientology's Los Angeles Celebrity Centre, Tommy Davis, to meet with then-United States Deputy Secretary of State Richard Armitage. In the half-hour-long private meeting, they raised concerns with Armitage about the treatment of Scientologists in Germany and other countries.

In 2006, Weiland was listed on a "Senior Honor Roll" in Impact, the magazine of the International Association of Scientologists.

See also
 Office of Special Affairs

References

External links
 
 
 
 

Austrian Scientologists
Living people
Scientology officials
Year of birth missing (living people)